3W or 3-W may refer to:

3W (company), or World Wide Wargames, a wargame company founded in 1977
3rd meridian west, a longitude coordinate
OK-3W; see Oklahoma State Highway 3
ZPG-3W, a model of N class blimp
SLC-3W, a designation for Vandenberg AFB Space Launch Complex 3
TBM-3W, a model of Grumman TBF Avenger
AD-3W, a model of Douglas A-1 Skyraider
3W, a fictional place appearing in "Dark Water" and "Death in Heaven": episodes of the science-fiction show Doctor Who

See also

WWW (disambiguation)
W3 (disambiguation)
3 (disambiguation)
W (disambiguation)